The 2012/13 season of the Azerbaijan Women's Volleyball Super League,   was the annual season of the country's highest volleyball level and was conquered for 5th time in a row by Rabita Baku.

Teams
 Rabita Baku
 Igtisadchi Baku
 Azerrail Baku
 Lokomotiv Baku
 Baki-Azeryol
 Telekom Baku
 Lokomotiv Balajary

|}

Following the decision of the Azerbaijan Women's Volleyball Super League, Igtisadchi Baku and Azerrail Baku shared the runner-up position; therefore, both teams are ranked at the 2nd place.

Program

Round I

|}

|}

|}

|}

|}

|}

|}

Round II

|}

|}

|}

|}

|}

|}

|}

Round III

|}

|}

|}

|}

|}

|}

|}

|}

|}

Round IV

|}

|}

|}

|}

|}

|}

|}

Awards
MVP:  Madelaynne Montaño (Rabita Baku)
Best Scorer:  Aneta Havlíčková (Lokomotiv Baku)
Best Setter:  Katarzyna Skorupa (Rabita Baku)
Best Blocker:  Lauren Paolini (Igtisadchi Baku)
Best Server:  Corina Ssuschke-Voigt (Lokomotiv Baku)
Best Spiker:  Foluke Akinradewo (Rabita Baku)
Best Receiver:  Áurea Cruz (Rabita Baku)
Best Digger:  Valeriya Korotenko (Azerrail Baku)
Best Libero:  Brenda Castillo (Rabita Baku)

References

External links
 Volleyball in Azerbaijan

Volleyball competitions in Azerbaijan